Vishwa Gopal Jhingran (1919–1991) was an Indian zoologist and aquaculture scientist, known for the introduction of a composite fish culture technique by name, aquaplosion. He was a recipient of the fourth highest Indian civilian award of Padma Shri from the Government of India in 1977.

Biography
Born in the Indian state of Uttar Pradesh in 1919, Jhingran secured his doctoral degree (PhD) from Stanford University, USA in 1948. He served as the director of the Central Inland Fisheries Research Institute (CIFRI), Barrackpore where he was known to have introduced pioneering techniques in aquaculture. His contributions have been reported in the propagation of Mrigal carp and the fish tagging operations in Chilka lake, a large brackish water lagoon in Odisha, India. He was the author of a voluminous work on fisheries, Fish and Fisheries of India and a manual of hatching techniques, A Hatchery Manual for the Common, Chinese, and Indian Major Carps. He also published handbooks and several monographs on various Indian fish species.

Jhingran was the president of the Inland Fisheries Society of India and chaired the Food and Agriculture Organization sponsored symposium on Development and Utilization of Indian Fisheries Resources held in Colombo in 1976. A member of Sigma Xi, USA, Jihngran was a fellow of the Zoological Society of India, the Indian National Science Academy and the National Academy of Sciences, India. He was a recipient of the Rafi Ahmed Kidwai Memorial Prize in 1973 and the civilian honour of Padma Shri in 1976.

Vishwa Gopal Jhingran died on 15 January 1991 at the age of 71.

Bibliography

 Fish and Fisheries of India
 A Hatchery Manual for the Common, Chinese, and Indian Major Carps
 Introduction to Aquaculture
 Synopsis of Biological Data on Catla: Catla Catla
 Coldwater Fisheries of India
 Synopsis of Biological Data on the Mrigal: Cirrhinus Mrigala
 Methodology for Survey of Brackishwater Areas in India for Coastal Aquaculture
 Catalogue of Cultivated Aquatic Organisms
 Synopsis of biological data on the Mrigal, Cirrhinus mrigala
 Synopsis of Biological Data on Rohu, Labeo Rohita

See also

 Aquaculture

References

External links
 

Recipients of the Padma Shri in science & engineering
1919 births
1991 deaths
Scientists from Jharkhand
20th-century Indian zoologists
Indian scientific authors
Stanford University alumni
Fellows of the Indian National Science Academy
Fellows of The National Academy of Sciences, India
Aquaculture in India
Indian agriculturalists